Paustovo is a rural locality (a village) and the administrative center of Paustovskoye Rural Settlement, Vyaznikovsky District, Vladimir Oblast, Russia. The population was 1,140 as of 2010. There are 13 streets.

Geography 
Paustovo is located 19 km south of Vyazniki (the district's administrative centre) by road. Uspensky Pogost is the nearest rural locality.

References 

Rural localities in Vyaznikovsky District